Alvin York: A New Biography of the Hero of the Argonne is a biography of Alvin York by Douglas V. Mastriano published in 2014 by the University Press of Kentucky.

Awards
The book received the Colby Award in 2015.

Accuracy
Complaints have been made about the accuracy of the book, including its citations and a claim that a picture on the dust jacket shows Alvin York and prisoners he took. Thirty-five citations are believed to be fraudulent, and the picture in question is dated as being from twelve days before York captured 132 German soldiers.

References

External links
Presentation by Mastriano on Alvin York at the Colby Military Writers' Symposium, April 9, 2015

2014 non-fiction books
World War I books
Non-fiction books about the United States Army
University Press of Kentucky books